Kadethrin is a synthetic pyrethroid with the chemical formula C23H24O4S which is used as an insecticide. It is the most potent knockdown pyrethroid (even stronger than pyrethrin II) but it is relatively unstable, especially when exposed to light (due to both the furan ring and the thiolactone group in the molecule).

References 

Pyrethroids
Insecticides
Furans
Carboxylate esters
Thiolanes
Thiolactones